Stella Baruk (born 1932 in Yazd, Iran) is an influential Iranian-born French teacher, mathematician, author and educationalist. Since the 1970s she has been a key innovator in the teaching of mathematics in French schools.

Works
 Echec et maths (Seuil, 1973)
 Fabrice ou l'école des mathématiques (Seuil, 1977)
 L'Âge du capitaine – de l'erreur en mathématiques (Seuil, 1985)
 Dictionnaire de mathématiques élémentaires (Seuil, 1992)
 C’est-à-dire, en mathématiques ou ailleurs (Seuil, 1993)
 Comptes pour petits et grands, vol. 1, Pour un apprentissage du nombre et de la numération fondé sur la langue et le sens (Magnard, 1997)
 Comptes pour petits et grands, vol. 2, Pour un apprentissage des opérations, des calculs, et des problèmes, fondé sur la langue et le sens (Magnard, 2003)
 Si 7=0 – Quelles mathématiques pour l'école? (Odile Jacob, 2004)
 Naître en français (Gallimard, 2006) – texte autobiographique
 Dico de Mathématiques (collège et CM2), (Seuil, 2008)
 Pour une intelligence du nombre (Seuil, à paraître)
 Mes premières mathématiques avec Némo et Mila CP(Magnard, 2012)
 Nombres à compter et à raconter, (Seuil, 2014)
 Les chiffres ? Même pas peur !, (Puf, 2016)

Decoration 
 On 2 December 2008, she was made a chevalier of the Légion d'honneur. She was promoted to officier on 30 December 2016.

References

People from Yazd
1930 births
Living people
Mathematics educators
French women writers
Officiers of the Légion d'honneur